Guilherme Guedes may refer to:

 Guilherme Guedes (footballer, born 1999), Brazilian football left-back for Grêmio
 Guilherme Guedes (footballer, born 2002), Portuguese football midfielder for Vitória Guimarães